= Japanese Monroe Doctrine for Asia =

In considering a Japanese Monroe Doctrine for Asia to block the expansion of European powers in Northern China and Korea, President Theodore Roosevelt in 1905 talked informally with Japanese visitors to the White House and his Oyster Bay, Long Island estate. He suggested that just as his "Roosevelt Corollary" to the Monroe Doctrine kept out Europeans in the Western hemisphere, so Japan at some future day should have a Japanese Monroe Doctrine for Asia to keep out European colonizers.

== See also ==
- Asian Monroeism
